Holland Patent Stone Churches Historic District is a national historic district located at Holland Patent in Oneida County, New York. The district includes four monumental Greek Revival churches, the village green, and an 1890s band stand / gazebo.

It was listed on the National Register of Historic Places in 1991.

Gallery

See also
National Register of Historic Places listings in Oneida County, New York

References

External links

Churches on the National Register of Historic Places in New York (state)
Historic districts on the National Register of Historic Places in New York (state)
Historic districts in Oneida County, New York
Stone churches in New York (state)
National Register of Historic Places in Oneida County, New York